Kelli may refer to:

Places
Kelli, Drama, a former village in the Drama regional unit, Greece
Kelli, Florina, a village in the Florina regional unit, Greece

Notable people

Surname 
Keri Kelli (born 1971), American guitarist

Given name 
Kelli Giddish (born 1980), American actress
Kelli Kuehne  (born 1977), American professional golfer.
Kelli Williams (born 1970), American actress
Kelli Kassidi, alias of voice actor Megan Hollingshead
Kelli Carpenter-O'Donnell (born 1967), television executive and co-founder of R Family Vacations
Kelli Gannon (born 1978) American field hockey player
Kelli Ali (born 1974), English vocalist
Kelli O'Hara  (born 1976), American stage actress, singer, and songwriter
Kelli Williams (born 1970), American actress.
Kelli Garner  (born 1984), American actress.
Kelli Stack (born 1988), American ice hockey forward
Kelli McCarty (born 1969), American model, actress and adult film performer
Kelli White (born 1977 ), American former sprinter
Kelli Maroney (born 1960), American actress
Kelli Young (born 1981), English pop singer
Kelli Stanley (born 1964), American author
Kelli Cousins (born 1976), American voice actress
Kelli James (born 1970), American field hockey player
Kelli Underwood (born 1977), American radio and television sports journalist
Kelli Hollis (born 1967), British actress
Kelli Linville  (born 1948), American politician in Washington state
Kelli Berglund (born 1996), American actress and dancer
Kelli Scarr, American singer and songwriter
Kelli Finglass, American professional cheerleader
Kelli Martin (born 1980), American fashion designer
Kelli Stargel (born 1966), American politician
Kelli Connell, American photographer 
Kelli Lidell, American country singer, actress and philanthropist
Kelli Harral (born 1993), American model 
Kelli Sobonya (born 1963), American politician in West Virginia 
Kelli Arena, American television journalist and teacher
Kelli Delaney, fashion executive and designer
Kelli Harrison, American aide to Mitt and Ann Romney 
Kelli Shean (born 1987), South African golfer
Kelli Goss (born 1992), American film and television actress

Fictional characters
Kelli Lombardo Moltisanti, see List of characters from The Sopranos#Recurring characters
 Kelli Presley from Black Christmas (2006)
 Kelli is the name of an empousa in Percy Jackson
 Kelli Dunley, a character from the Lifetime movie Reviving Ophelia

See also
Kellie (disambiguation)
Kelly (disambiguation)
Kelley (disambiguation)